Dragon Country may refer to:

 Dragon Country, an anthology of plays by Tennessee Williams
 Four Asian Tigers, also known as 'Four Asian Dragons', the economies of South Korea, Taiwan, Singapore and Hong Kong
 Bhutan, sometimes translated as Dragon Country; see Flag of Bhutan